Carlos Martín Díaz del Río (born 9 July 1993) is a Chilean middle-distance runner who competes mainly in the 1500 metres. He holds a Chilean Record of 3:37.86 minutes for the distance. He was the gold medallist in the event at the South American Championships in Athletics in 2015.

Díaz rose through the age categories, taking the South American Youth title in 2010, a South American Junior bronze in 2011, then a gold medal at the South American Under-23 Championships in Athletics in 2014. As a senior athlete he is a two-time medallist at the Ibero-American Championships in Athletics and won a bronze at the 2014 Pan American Sports Festival.

Career
He came from a sporting background, as his mother Julia del Río had competed internationally for Chile at the IAAF World Cross Country Championships. He began to train in distance running with his mother as his coach from a young age. Díaz made his international debut at the 2008 South American Youth Championships in Athletics, where he was ninth. He represented his country at the global level the year after, running in the heats at the 2009 World Youth Championships in Athletics. He returned to continental level at the 2010 South American Youth Championships in Athletics and had his first success, taking the 1500 m gold on home turf in Santiago de Chile. Another youth level medal came at the 2010 South American Cross Country Championships, where his fourth-place finish led Chile to the team bronze medals. He began to make progress in the under-20 category at the 2011 South American Junior Championships in Athletics, taking a bronze as the youngest 1500 m medallist as well as fourth in the 800 m.

He began his 2012 with his first senior medal, taking bronze at the 2012 Ibero-American Championships in Athletics just ahead of his older compatriot Iván López. He became an under-20 global finalist at the 2012 World Junior Championships in Athletics, finishing seventh after a national junior record of 3:43.16 minutes in the qualifiers. He moved up another age category for the 2012 South American Under-23 Championships in Athletics and took the bronze medal, beaten this time by López, as well as Argentine Federico Bruno.

He failed to improve his personal best in 2013, but took a silver medal behind Leandro de Oliveira at the South American Road Mile Championships and was runner-up at the inaugural Chilean National Sports Games. Díaz returned to the track for Chile in 2014. First, he came close to a personal best at the South American Games in the Chilean capital but narrowly missed a medal behind Colombia's Rafith Rodríguez. After a personal best of 3:40.24 minutes in July, he scored two international bronze medals: first repeating his finish at the Ibero-American Championships, then coming third at the Pan American Sports Festival (Venezuela's Marvin Blanco won both times). In his last outing of the year he topped the podium at the South American Under-23 Championships with a championship record time of 3:44.52 minutes.

Díaz was an improved runner at the start of 2015 and set personal bests in the 1500 metres (3:40.15) and 3000 metres (7:56.34). He set a new best in the 10K run, defending his title in that section of the Santiago Marathon with a time of 28:45 minutes. At the age of twenty-one, Díaz established himself as one of the region's top middle-distance runners at the 2015 South American Championships in Athletics by securing his first senior gold in the 1500 m. – one of two winners for Chile at the meeting, alongside Víctor Aravena.

In 2018, Díaz made a move up in distance to the half marathon, and in his debut, broke the Chilean record by almost 2 minutes with a time of 1:02:22.

Personal bests
800 metres – 1:50.35 minutes (2014)
1500 metres – 3:37.86 minutes (2015)
3000 metres – 7:53.37 minutes (2015)
5000 metres – 13:59 minutes (Panamerican Games 2015)
10K run – 28:45 minutes (2015)
Half marathon - 1:02:22 hours (Valencia Half Marathon 2018)
1500 metres Indoor – 3:42.23 minutes (Sabadell 2016)
3000 metres Indoor – 7:59.23 minutes (Sabadell 2016)

International competitions

References

External links

Living people
1993 births
Chilean male middle-distance runners
Athletes (track and field) at the 2015 Pan American Games
Athletes (track and field) at the 2019 Pan American Games
World Athletics Championships athletes for Chile
Athletes (track and field) at the 2018 South American Games
South American Games gold medalists for Chile
South American Games medalists in athletics
Pan American Games bronze medalists for Chile
Pan American Games medalists in athletics (track and field)
Medalists at the 2019 Pan American Games
South American Games gold medalists in athletics